Evan Hunter, born Salvatore Albert Lombino, (October 15, 1926 – July 6, 2005) was an American author and screenwriter best known for his 87th Precinct novels, written under his Ed McBain pen name, and the novel upon which the film Blackboard Jungle was based.

Hunter, who legally adopted that name in 1952, also used the pen names John Abbott, Curt Cannon, Hunt Collins, Ezra Hannon, and Richard Marsten, among others. His 87th Precinct novels have become staples of the police procedural genre.

Life

Early life
Salvatore Lombino was born and raised in New York City. He lived in East Harlem until age 12, when his family moved to the Bronx. He attended Olinville Junior High School (later Richard R. Green Middle School #113), then Evander Childs High School (now Evander Childs Educational Campus), before winning a New York Art Students League scholarship.  Later, he was admitted as an art student at Cooper Union. Lombino served in the United States Navy during World War II and wrote several short stories while serving aboard a destroyer in the Pacific. However, none of these stories was published until after he had established himself as an author in the 1950s.

After the war, Lombino returned to New York and attended Hunter College, where he majored in English and psychology, with minors in dramatics and education, and graduated Phi Beta Kappa in 1950. He published a weekly column in the Hunter College newspaper as "S.A. Lombino". In 1981, Lombino was inducted into the Hunter College Hall of Fame, where he was honored for outstanding professional achievement.

While looking to start a career as a writer, Lombino took a variety of jobs, including 17 days as a teacher at Bronx Vocational High School in September 1950. This experience would later form the basis for his novel The Blackboard Jungle (1954), written under the pen name Evan Hunter, which was adapted into the film Blackboard Jungle (1955).

In 1951, Lombino took a job as an executive editor for the Scott Meredith Literary Agency, working with authors such as Poul Anderson, Arthur C. Clarke, Lester del Rey, Richard S. Prather, and P.G. Wodehouse. He made his first professional short story sale the same year, a science-fiction tale titled "Welcome, Martians!", credited to S. A. Lombino.

Name change and pen names

Soon after his initial sale, Lombino sold stories under the pen names Evan Hunter and Hunt Collins.  The name Evan Hunter is generally believed to have been derived from two schools he attended, Evander Childs High School and Hunter College, although the author himself would never confirm that. (He did confirm that Hunt Collins was derived from Hunter College.)  Lombino legally changed his name to Evan Hunter in May 1952, after an editor told him that a novel he wrote would sell more copies if credited to Evan Hunter than to S. A. Lombino.  Thereafter, he used the name Evan Hunter both personally and professionally.

As Evan Hunter, he gained notice with his novel The Blackboard Jungle (1954) dealing with juvenile crime and the New York City public school system. The film adaptation followed in 1955.

During this era, Hunter also wrote a great deal of genre fiction. He was advised by his agents that publishing too much fiction under the Hunter byline, or publishing any crime fiction as Evan Hunter, might weaken his literary reputation.  Consequently, during the 1950s Hunter used the pseudonyms Curt Cannon, Hunt Collins, and Richard Marsten for much of his crime fiction.  A prolific author in several genres, Hunter also published approximately two dozen science fiction stories and four science-fiction novels between 1951 and 1956 under the names S. A. Lombino, Evan Hunter, Richard Marsten, D. A. Addams, and Ted Taine.

Ed McBain, his best known pseudonym, was first used with Cop Hater (1956), the first novel in the 87th Precinct crime series. Hunter revealed that he was McBain in 1958 but continued to use the pseudonym for decades, notably for the 87th Precinct series and the Matthew Hope detective series. He retired the pen names Addams, Cannon, Collins, Marsten, and Taine around 1960. From then on crime novels were generally attributed to McBain and other sorts of fiction to Hunter. Reprints of crime-oriented stories and novels written in the 1950s previously attributed to other pseudonyms were reissued under the McBain byline. Hunter stated that the division of names allowed readers to know what to expect: McBain novels had a consistent writing style, while Hunter novels were more varied.

Under the Hunter name, novels steadily appeared throughout the 1960s, 1970s, and early 1980s, including Come Winter (1973) and Lizzie (1984). Hunter was also successful as screenwriter for film and television. He wrote the screenplay for the Hitchcock film The Birds (1963), loosely adapted from Daphne du Maurier's eponymous 1952 novelette. Following The Birds, Hunter was again hired by Hitchcock to complete an in-progress script adapting Winston Graham's novel Marnie. However, Hunter and the director disagreed on how to treat the novel's rape scene, and the writer was sacked. Hunter's other screenplays included Strangers When We Meet (1960), based on his own 1958 novel; and Fuzz (1972), based on his eponymous 1968 87th Precinct novel, which he had written as Ed McBain.

After having thirteen 87th Precinct novels published from 1956 to 1960, further 87th Precinct novels appeared at a rate of approximately one a year until his death. Additionally, NBC ran a police drama called 87th Precinct during the 1961–62 season, based on McBain's work.

From 1978 to 1998, McBain published a series about lawyer Matthew Hope; books in this series appeared every year or two, and usually had titles derived from well-known children's stories. For about a decade, from 1984 to 1994, Hunter published no fiction under his own name.  In 2000, a novel called Candyland appeared that was credited to both Hunter and McBain. The two-part novel opened in Hunter's psychologically based narrative voice before switching to McBain's customary police procedural style.

Aside from McBain, Hunter used at least two other pseudonyms for his fiction after 1960: Doors (1975), which was originally attributed to Ezra Hannon before being reissued as a work by McBain, and Scimitar (1992), which was credited to John Abbott.

Hunter gave advice to other authors in his article "Dig in and get it done: no-nonsense advice from a prolific author (aka Ed McBain) on starting and finishing your novel". In it, he advised authors to "find their voice for it is the most important thing in any novel".

Dean Hudson controversy
Hunter was long rumored to have written an unknown number of pornographic novels, as Dean Hudson, for William Hamling's publishing houses.  Hunter adamantly and consistently denied writing any books as Hudson until he died. However, apparently his agent Scott Meredith sold books to Hamling's company as Hunter's work and received payments for these books in cash. While notable, it is not definitive proof: Meredith almost certainly forwarded novels to Hamling by any number of authors, claiming these novels were by Hunter simply to make a sale. Ninety-three novels were published under the Hudson name from 1961 to 1969, and the most avid proponents of the Hunter-as-Hudson theory do not believe Hunter is responsible for all 93.

Personal life
He had three sons: Richard Hunter, an author, speaker, advisor to chief information officers on business value and risk issues, and harmonica player; Mark Hunter, an academic, educator, investigative reporter, and author; and Ted Hunter, a painter, who died in 2006.

Death
A heavy smoker for many decades, Hunter had three heart attacks over a number of years (his first in 1987) and needed a heart operation. A precancerous lesion was found on his larynx in 1992. This was removed, but the problem later returned, and Hunter died from laryngeal cancer in 2005, aged 78, in Weston, Connecticut.

Awards
Edgar Award nomination for Best Short Story, "The Last Spin" (Manhunt, Sept. 1956)
Edgar Award nomination  for Best Motion Picture, The Birds (1964)
Edgar Award nomination for Best Short Story, "Sardinian Incident" (Playboy, Oct. 1971)
Grand Master, Mystery Writers of America (1986)
Diamond Dagger, British Crime Writers Assn (first American recipient, 1998)
Anthony Award nomination for Best Series of the Century (2000)
Edgar Award nomination for Best Novel, Money, Money, Money (2002)

Works

Novels

Collections 
1956:  The Jungle Kids (Short Stories) (short stories by Evan Hunter)
1957:  The Merry, Merry Christmas 
1957:  On the Sidewalk Bleeding 
1960:  The Last Spin & Other Stories 
1962:  The Empty Hours (87th Precinct short stories by Ed McBain)
1965:  Happy New Year, Herbie (short stories by Evan Hunter)
1972:  The Easter Man (a Play) And Six Stories (by Evan Hunter)
1982:  The McBain Brief (Short stories by Ed McBain)
1988:  McBain's Ladies (87th Precinct short stories by Ed McBain)
1992:  McBain's Ladies, Too (87th Precinct short stories by Ed McBain)
2000:  Barking at Butterflies & Other Stories (by Evan Hunter)
2000:  Running from Legs (by Evan Hunter)
2006:  Learning to Kill (short story collection by Ed McBain, published posthumously, featuring works written 1952-57)

Autobiographical 
1998:  Me & Hitch! (by Evan Hunter)
2005:  Let's Talk (by Evan Hunter)

Plays 
The Easter Man (1964)
The Conjuror (1969)

Screenplays 
Strangers When We Meet (1960)
The Birds (1963)
Fuzz (1972)
Walk Proud (1979)

Teleplays 
The Chisholms, CBS miniseries starring Robert Preston (1979)
The Legend of Walks Far Woman (1980)
Dream West (1986)

As editor 
2000:  The Best American Mystery Stories (by Evan Hunter)
2005:  Transgressions (collection of crime novellas by various authors edited by Ed McBain)

Incomplete novels
 Becca in Jeopardy (Near completion at the time of Hunter's death. Apparently to remain unpublished.)

Film adaptations
Blackboard Jungle (1955) by Richard Brooks, from Blackboard Jungle
High and Low (1963) by Akira Kurosawa, from King's Ransom
Mister Buddwing (1966) by Delbert Mann, from Buddwing
Last Summer (1969) by Frank Perry, from Last Summer
Sans mobile apparent (1971) by Philippe Labro, from Ten Plus One
Every Little Crook and Nanny (1972) by Cy Howard, from Every Little Crook and Nanny
Blood Relatives (1978) by Claude Chabrol, from Blood Relatives
Lonely Heart (1981) by Kon Ichikawa, from Lady, Lady, I Did It

References

External links
 
 Hunter/McBain bibliography at Hard-Boiled
 Official Evan Hunter and Ed McBain websites
 Evan Hunter and Ed McBain on Internet Book List
 
 
 
 1993 interview, A Discussion with... National Authors on Tour TV Series
 1995 interview, A Discussion with... National Authors on Tour TV Series
 2001 interview with Leonard Lopate at WNYC (archived)
 2005 interview with David Bianculli at NPR

1926 births
2005 deaths
20th-century American novelists
American male novelists
20th-century American short story writers
American male screenwriters
Hunter College alumni
Cooper Union alumni
American television writers
American children's writers
American mystery writers
20th-century American memoirists
Novelists from New York (state)
People from East Harlem
People from the Bronx
American writers of Italian descent
Deaths from laryngeal cancer
Cartier Diamond Dagger winners
Edgar Award winners
Deaths from cancer in Connecticut
American male short story writers
20th-century American dramatists and playwrights
American male television writers
American male dramatists and playwrights
Screenwriters from New York (state)
American male non-fiction writers
20th-century American male writers
United States Navy personnel of World War II
20th-century American screenwriters
20th-century pseudonymous writers
21st-century pseudonymous writers